Darling Heights is a rural residential locality in the Toowoomba Region, Queensland, Australia.

Geography

Darling Heights lies on the southern edge of the city, on the west ridge. The land falls away steeply to the west toward Drayton, the slope being occupied by detached bungalow housing with an admixture of larger homes, duplexes and small blocks of units. Most of these dwellings are less than 10 years old, the area having previously been mostly horse paddocks, of which few remain. The homes and businesses in the western part of Darling Heights are considered part of Drayton. To the east, the upper valley of West Creek forms the suburb of Kearneys Spring, the western part of which is considered part of Darling Heights by many people. The southern part of the suburb is an area of acreage blocks and small farms. To the north lies the suburb of Harristown.

History 
Darling Heights State School opened on 29 January 1980.

Population
According to the 2016 census of Population, there were 5,192 people in Darling Heights.

 Aboriginal and Torres Strait Islander people made up 3.9% of the population. 
 62.9% of people were born in Australia. The most common countries of birth were India 6.8% and Iraq 4.0%.   
 65.8% of people only spoke English at home. Other languages spoken at home included Arabic 5.4%, Telugu 2.7% and Mandarin 2.1%. 
 The most common responses for religion were Catholic 20.2%, No Religion 18.6%, Anglican 11.8% and Islam 9.2%.

Attractions
 Toowoomba's Japanese Gardens
 Darling Heights Post Office (at the USQ Campus on the ground floor of W Block)
 Uni Plaza, a strip mall with a variety of specialist retailers, eateries and services. (Officially in Kearneys Spring as it is on the east side of West Street)

Education
Darling Heights State School is a government primary (Prep-6) school for boys and girls at Wuth Street. In 2017, the school had an enrolment of 690 students with 57 teachers (53 full-time equivalent) and 49 non-teaching staff (33 full-time equivalent). It includes a special education program and an intensive English language program.

There is the Darling Heights Campus of University of Southern Queensland, the first campus developed for the university.

Public transport

Darling Heights is served by the Number 901 Toowoomba City Bus route, which winds through the suburb.

Additionally, the University of Southern Queensland acts as a major terminus, with services to the City, KMart Plaza and Clifford Gardens regularly 9:00am to 5:00pm Monday to Friday.

Despite the Queensland Rail line from Toowoomba to Drayton and southwards forming the western boundary of the suburb, there are no passenger rail services in this area.

References

External links
 University of Queensland: Queensland Places: Darling Heights

Suburbs of Toowoomba
Localities in Queensland